Army Emergency Relief (AER), often referred to by the longer title Army Emergency Relief Fund, is a non-profit, charitable organization independent of, but closely associated with the United States Army, founded in 1942.  The organization is headquartered in Arlington, VA.

Mission
The mission of the AER is to help US Army soldiers and their dependents, by providing emergency aid, in the form of either a direct grant (a cash gift, not to be repaid) or an interest-free loan, and by giving college scholarships to children of soldiers. Under Army regulations, officers must recommend whether their soldiers deserve aid.

Loans up to $1000 do not require command recommendation, and there is no limit to the amount of funds Army Emergency Relief may authorize. Officers are responsible for ensuring that their soldiers repay AER loans.

Assets, aid, and expenses 
In February 2009, the Associated Press reported that the AER had, between 2003 and 2007, distributed a total of $64 million in aid, an average of $13 million per year, while adding $117 million to its reserves, and reaching total assets of $345 million.  AER ended 2007 with a $296 million in its investment portfolio of stocks and bonds. During that five-year period of 2003-2007, AER's emergency assistance consisted of 91 percent repayable loans and 9 percent direct grants. In 2008, AER gave out $5.5 million in emergency grants, $65 million in loans, and $12 million in scholarships, to a total of 72,000 people.  For 2009, AER plans to reduce its total scholarships to $8 million.

As of early 2009, AER was paying for a staff of 21 people, all at its headquarters at the Army Human Resources Command in Alexandria, Virginia, with the Army paying 300 or so other civilians, located at ninety Army sites worldwide, who worked full-time for the AER. The Army also provides AER its office space at no charge.

Armed Forces Relief Trust 

In 2003, a new nonprofit organization, the Armed Forces Relief Trust, was formed with assistance from the National Association of Broadcasters.  
The mission of the trust is to assist the four military aid societies - AER, the Air Force Aid Society, the Navy-Marine Corps Relief Society, and the Coast Guard Mutual Assistance, by providing a single place to receive donations for the entire U.S. Armed Services.

References

External links 
Official AER site
Armed Forces Relief Trust

Charities based in Virginia
United States Army associations
United States military support organizations